Joseph Holden may refer to:

 Joe Holden (1913–1996), American baseball player, manager and scout
 Joseph W. Holden (1844–1875), North Carolina politician
 Joey Holden (born 1990), Irish hurler
 Joseph Holden, Veritas International University President